Tourmaline (born 1983; formerly known as Reina Gossett) is an American artist, filmmaker, activist, editor, and writer. She is a transgender woman who identifies as queer. Tourmaline is most notable for her work in transgender activism and economic justice, through her work with the Sylvia Rivera Law Project, Critical Resistance and Queers for Economic Justice.

In 2017, she edited the book Trap Door: Trans Cultural Production and the Politics of Visibility, with co-editors Eric A. Stanley and Johanna Burton. The book is part of a series called Critical Anthologies in Art and Culture by MIT Press. Tourmaline served as the 2016–2018 Activist-in-Residence at Barnard Center for Research on Women. She is based in New York City.

Early life

Tourmaline was born on July 20, 1983, and grew up in a feminist household in Massachusetts. Her mother is a union organizer and her father is a self-defense instructor and anti-imprisonment advocate. Her sibling Che Gossett is involved in AIDS activism and anti HIV criminalization work.

Tourmaline and Che went to a bilingual elementary school in Roxbury where "the teachers were abusive," and later attended suburban schools where they "went from living in poverty to going to school with wealthy people like Mitt Romney's kids."

Tourmaline moved to New York City for college in 2002.

Education
Tourmaline attended Columbia University, and received a B.A. degree in Comparative Ethnic Studies.

Through a school program called Island Academy, she taught creative writing classes at Rikers Island correctional institution. Columbia University's Middle East and Asian Languages and Cultures department, is colloquially known as MEALAC. While at Columbia, she served on the President's Council on Student Affairs, amidst a MEALAC Scandal. In addition, she was also a chaplain's associate and a member of Students Promoting Empowerment and Knowledge.

Activism 
Tourmaline has worked at various organizations dealing with transgender activism, economic justice, and prison abolition. She served as the Membership Coordinator for Queers for Economic Justice. At the Sylvia Rivera Law Project, she served as the Director of Membership. She has been a featured speaker about transgender issues at GLAAD.

Along with Critical Resistance, Tourmaline organized a campaign with low income LGBTGNC that prevented the NYC Department of Corrections from building a $375 million jail in the Bronx. Tourmaline has done prison abolition work through a video series, titled No One is Disposable: Everyday Practices of Prison Abolition, with Dean Spade.

Tourmaline has also performed work as a community historian for drag queens and transgender individuals around the Stonewall Inn rebellion, observing how archives and repositories rarely prioritize saving transgender artist materials. Instead, Tourmaline has stated that these materials are typically "accidentally archived." Tourmaline has combated this with contemporary trans focused projects, including Tumblr blogs, such as The Spirit Was..., and podcasts.

Tourmaline was featured in Brave Spaces: Perspectives on Faith and LGBT Justice (2015), which was produced by Marc Smolowitz and screened as a Human Rights Campaign event.

In January 2016, Tourmaline publicly supported a protest of the A Wider Bridge reception at the National LGBTQ Task Force's Creating Change conference in Chicago, which was intended to honor the leaders of Jerusalem Open House, the Israeli LGBTQ center. The protest, which turned violent, was characterized as anti-Semitic by opponents, while the organizer stated that it was preceded by a "queer, anti-Zionist Shabbat service" and was co-organized by the group Jewish Voice for Peace.

Film
Tourmaline began her film career in 2010 when she worked on Kagendo Murungi’s Taking Freedom Home.  For this film she gathered oral histories form LGBTQ New Yorkers on the challenges faced accessing affordable housing, medical care, and social services.  In 2016 she directed her first film The personal Things which features trans elder Miss Major Griffin-Gracy.  In this film Griffin-Gracy reflects on her life as an activist who participated in the Stonewall Riots. In 2017 she was awarded a Queer Art Prize for her work in on this film.  Tourmaline also worked on the Golden Globe  nominated film Mudbound as an assistant director to Dee Rees.

In 2017, Tourmaline’s work was featured at the New Museum in New York in an exhibition titled Trigger: Gender as a Tool and a Weapon.

Tourmaline has made numerous films about trans activism. STAR People Are Beautiful People (2009), co-produced with Sasha Wortzel, documents the life and work of Sylvia Rivera and STAR (Street Transvestite Action Revolutionaries). Her next work, also co-produced with Wortzel, Happy Birthday, Marsha!, explores the life of activist Marsha P. Johnson. Trans women played every major role in the film and queer and trans activists volunteered at the event.

In October 2017, Tourmaline alleged that filmmaker David France plagiarized her grant submission to the Arcus Foundation to create the documentary The Death and Life of Marsha P. Johnson, which debuted on Netflix on October 6. Tourmaline and collaborator Sasha Wortzel were applying for a grant for financial assistance to release their short film, Happy Birthday, Marsha. This claim was supported by transgender activist Janet Mock. France denied the allegation. Independent investigations launched by both Jezebel and The Advocate exonerated France and concluded that Gossett's allegations against him were without merit. The debate has brought up questions of artistic integrity, who owns archival footage, and what constitutes a valid accusation.

In 2020, the Museum of Modern Art acquired her 2019 film Salacia, about Mary Jones, for its permanent collection.  In 2021, The Metropolitan Museum of Art acquired two works, including Summer Azure, by the artist for display in Before Yesterday We Could Fly: An Afrofuturist Period Room.

Honors

 2017 Queer Art Prize Finalist
2019 Stonewall Community Foundation Honoree
 George Soros Justice Advocacy Fellowship
 Happy Birthday, Marsha! was recognized by filmmaker Ira Sachs and awarded a fellowship with Sach's Queer/Art/Mentorship program for the 2012–2013 school year.
 2020 Time 100
2021 Guggenheim Fellowship

See also
 List of transgender film and television directors

References

External links
 
 
 Wikipedia Edit-a-thon: Conversation with Orit Gat, Reina Gossett, Jenna Wortham, and Fiona Romeo discussion at MoMA, March 5, 2016
 Happy Birthday, Marsha! Directed by Reina Gossett and Sasha Wortzel

1983 births
Living people
Columbia College (New York) alumni
American feminists
LGBT people from Massachusetts
Queer women
Transgender rights activists
Transgender women
Transgender artists
LGBT African Americans
African-American activists
21st-century American women
Women civil rights activists
21st-century African-American women
20th-century African-American people
20th-century African-American women
Transfeminists